Beawar is a city in Beawar district of Rajasthan, India. Beawar was the financial capital of Merwara state of Rajputana. As of 2011, the population of Beawar is 342,935. The city used to be a major center for trade, especially in raw cotton, and used to have cotton presses and the Krishna cotton mills. Currently, major industries include mineral-based units, machine-based units, machine tools and accessories, pre-stressed concrete pipes, plastic products, textiles, wooden furniture and asbestos cement pipes. Beawar is the largest producer of cement in northern India and home to Shree Cement. It is situated in a mineral-rich region having reserves of feldspar, quartz, asbestos, soapstone, magnesite, calcite, limestone, mica, emerald, granite, and masonry stone. Reserves of barytes, fluorite, wollastonite and vermiculite have also been found. Nearest airports are Jodhpur (145 km), Kishangarh and Jaipur (190 km). It is also connected by RSRTC operated buses to all parts of Rajasthan, and neighboring Delhi NCR, Ahmedabad (Gujarat), Gwalior (Madhya Pradesh). It also has railway connectivity with Delhi, Mumbai, Ahmadabad, Bangalore (bi-weekly), Haridwar, Dehradun (weekly), Bareilly and Muzzafarpur.

History

In the early 19th century, Beawar was a village. By 1825, the British acquired control of the Ajmer-Merwara region, and established a cantonment around 4 miles from the existing village. In 1836, they attracted merchants and constructed a bazaar (market), which became the core of a site called "Naya Shahar" or "Naya Nagar" ("New Town"). Colonel George Dickson (1795-1857) established this new town on the waste land adjacent to the cantonment and the original Beawar village. The area eventually evolved into the present-day town of Beawar.

The population of the town rose substantially over the next decade, as it became the centre of cotton trade. In 1871, the battalion was moved from the local cantonment to Ajmer, but the town continued remained an important trading centre.

A municipality was established at Beawar in 1866. In 1880, railway reached the town, and in 1881, Krishna Cotton Mill was established there. By 1901, the town had a population of 21,928, with 48.6 of the work force employed in the manufacturing sector (38% in cotton textiles industry). Metalwork, calico printing, and grain trade were the other important industries of the town.

Beawar is the birthplace of classical mathematician Duncan Sommerville.

Beawar city

Inner city
The inner city of Beawar is the old historical city, also known as the "Walled City" (Parkota). There are five famous gates of the city known as Ajmeri Gate, Mewari Gate, Chang Gate, Nehru Gate and Surajpole Gate. The area within these gates is the main market of Beawar.

Outer city
The outer area of Beawar is a developing area. Residential expansion is taking place on Ajmer road, Sendra Road and Delwara road, specially Raas Babra Road. An Army Cantonment is being established near Roopnagar which covers a vast area and have future prospects of business trade and development there. New shopping complexes and hotels are also being built. The outer city is home to all transport hubs such as central bus station, railway station, and private tour operators. The city also has a church, some degree-granting colleges, a shopping complex, and cinema halls (Jaimandir and City Cinema - a newly built multiplex)..

Currently a PVR cinema is being consturucted in Beawar.

Hotels
Most of the hotels are centered on the bus stand and railway station. It is important to note that as traveling patterns change, new hotels are coming up on the roads leading into town.

Education

Beawar has numerous schools and colleges spread throughout the city.

Colleges
 Sanatan Dharm Government College
 Satyam Institute of Technology
 Vardhaman girls college
 D. A. V. Girls college
 S.M.S. B.Sc. Nursing College
 Kanak College of Education
 Roop Rajat Institute of Nursing

RBSE-affiliated schools
 Adarsh Vidhya Mandir, Beawar
 Aaryabhatta Academy
 Adarsh Vidhya Mandir sec. school
 Deeksha Baal Vidyapeeth Nursery & Secondary School, Balar Road, Beawar
 Giriraj senior secondary school Beawar
 Giriraj Senior Secondary school Ajmer Road beawar
 Godawari Girls senior sec. school
Govt Girls Senior Secondary School,Chhawni Road,Beawar
 Government Sanatan Dharma senior secondary school, Beawar
 Govt Patel senior secondary school, Beawar
 Govt Gurukul senior secondary school, Beawar
 Jain Gurukul senior sec. school
 Mohammed Ali Memorial senior sec. school
 Noondri Mendratan sec. school
 St. Xavier's secondary school
 Salamat memorial school, Alinagar, Nundri Mendratan.
 Sardar Vallabhbhai Patel senior sec. school
 Shree Chimman Singh Lodha senior sec. school
 Shri Shanti Jain senior sec. school (Closed)
 Smt. Kanchan Devi Jain senior sec. school
 Jai Goldy English upper primary school
 Galaxy English senior sec. school

CBSE-affiliated schools

 Mangal Newton School, Beawar
 Army Public School Beawar (project to be sanction by station headquarter Ajmer) 
 Bhanwarlal Gothi Public Sr. Sec. English Medium School (B.L.Gothi)
 Central Academy Shree Cement
 Guru Siddharth International School
 Kendriya Vidyalaya
 Emmanuel Mission Sr. Sec. School
 St Paul's Sr. Sec. School
 Bangur Public School, Bangur City
 Shree Central Academy Sr. Sec. School, Bangur Nagar
 GDA School

Culture

Veer Tejaji maharaj Beawar Fair is one of the major fairs of the town. Locals of Beawar gather to celebrate Baadshah, which means "King". The Baadshah travels across the town to reach the Mayor's office, spraying colour all over the town in celebration of Holi, the festival of colours. It is celebrated in memory of the one-day king "Agarwal".

"Baadshah" is decorated in traditional style and travels up to the magistrate office, where it plays and gives its resolutions for the public. In front of it, another person, Birbal, dances in his special style. On the day of "Baadshah", there are performances by local people in "Teliwara" as well as near the Suraj Pol gate.

Annually, the city also celebrates Dushera by burning an effigy of Ravana on the eve of Dushera.

Famous Places 

 Shree Sankat Mochan Hanuman Temple
 Dadi Dham
 Ajmeri Gate
 Chang Gate
 Shoolbread Memorial Church (First Church of Rajasthan)
 Subhash Udyan (Also Known as Company Park)
 Neelkhanth Mahadev Temple Near Beawar
 Aashapura Mata Mandir

Demographics

As of the 2011 India census, Beawar had a population of 342,935. Males constitute 51% of the population and females 49%. Beawar has an average literacy rate of 64%, higher than the national average of 59.5%, with 60% of the males and 40% of females literate. Around 15% of the population was under 6 years of age.

Economy
Beawar is a hub of small scale industry (generating revenue in crores). Beawar is larger than many present district headquarters of Rajasthan. There has been demand for creating a Beawar district over the last two decades. Majority of employment is provided by RIICO. Beawar is also an important officie of Shree Cement.

Geography and climate

Map of Beawar's old urban area

Surrounding municipalities

Religious landmarks
 Shoolbread Memorial C. N. I. Church of Beawar Rajasthan. It is the First Church of Rajasthan at Beawar.
 Mata ji ki dungri
 Ekta Circle (Bharat Mata Circle) {between Ajmeri gate to Mewari gate}
 Goverdhan Nath Temple (Shree nath ji Mandir)
 Neelkanth Mahadev
 Ramdev jj ka mandir Lulwa khas
 Oldest Vishnu temple (Shri Rang ji ) Sendra road 
 Aashapura Mata ka Mandir
 Shri Sayan Mata ka Mandir (Shyam Garh)
 Ramdev Ji ka Mandir Lulwa Khas 
 Sankat Mochan Hanumaan Mandir (Shree Cement)
 Dadi Dham at Ajmer Road (temple of Shri Rani Sati Dadi, a replica of the popular one located in Jhunjhnu, Rajasthan)
 Shri SumatiNath Jain Temple
 Jain Dadawari
 subhash garden (company bag)
 shri Shantinath Jain Mandir, Pali Bazar, Beawar
 Mahadeo ji ki Chatri (Mahadeo Temple) {between Ajmeri gate and Mewari gate}
 Narsing Mandir
 Makardhwaj Balaji Dham, Balad Road, Nath, Nagar, Beawar

Notes

References

Beawar
Cities and towns in Ajmer district
Populated places established in 1835